The slow worm (Anguis fragilis) is a reptile native to western Eurasia. It is also called a deaf adder, a slowworm, a blindworm, or regionally, a long-cripple and hazelworm. These legless lizards are also sometimes called common slowworms. The "blind" in blindworm refers to the lizard's small eyes, similar to a blindsnake (although the slowworm's eyes are functional).

Slow worms are semifossorial (burrowing) lizards, spending much of their time hiding underneath objects. The skin of slow worms is smooth with scales that do not overlap one another. Like many other lizards, they autotomize, meaning that they have the ability to shed their tails to escape predators. While the tail regrows, it does not reach its original length. In the UK, they are common in gardens and allotments, and can be encouraged to enter and help remove pest insects by placing black plastic or providing places to shelter such as piles of logs, corrugated iron sheets or under tiles. On warm days, one or more slow worms can often be found underneath these heat collectors. One of the biggest causes of mortality in slow worms in suburban areas is the domestic cat, against which it has no defence.

Slow worms have been shown to be a species complex, consisting of 5 distinct but similar species.

Taxonomy 

Anguis fragilis was traditionally divided into two subspecies (A. f. fragilis and A. f. colchica), but they are now classified as separate species:

 Anguis fragilis sensu stricto (found in western Europe, northern Europe and western Balkans) and
 Anguis colchica (found in eastern Europe, eastern Balkans and in western Asia).
Three more species were later distinguished from A. fragilis:
 Anguis graeca (found in southern Balkans) and
 Anguis veronensis (found on the Apennine Peninsula).
Anguis cephalonica (native to the Peloponnese Peninsula)

Physical traits 

Slow worms have an elongated body with a circular cross-section without limbs and reach a maximum length of up to 57.5 cm. Most of the adult animals that can be observed are between 40 and 45 cm long, with up to 22 cm on the head and trunk section and the rest on the tail. There is no visible neck. The tail, which ends in a horny tip, is continuous with the trunk and is often slightly longer. Slow worms exhibit caudal autotomy, the severing of the tail when it is pulled by predators. When regrown the tail only grows back to a short stub.

The skin surface consists of smooth, round-to-hexagonal scales which overlap like roof tiles and which are roughly the same shape on the dorsal and ventral surfaces of the body. There are several longitudinal rows running along the underside. In total, the trunk has 125 to 150 transverse scale rows and the tail has another 130 to 160 rows. Under the scales there are bony plates (osteoderms), which means that slow worms crawl much more stiffly and clumsily than snakes. The scaling of the head is similar to that of snakes. The ear openings are mostly completely hidden under the scales. The relatively small eyes have movable, closable eyelids (these are fused in snakes) and round pupils. The rather short tongue is broad, bilobed and does not end in fine tips. To lick, i.e. to absorb odorous substances, slow worms have to open their mouths slightly, as they lack the gap in the upper lip that snakes possess. The pointed, sometimes quite loosely fixed teeth are curved backwards; there are 7 to 9 teeth in the premaxilla, 10 to 12 in the maxilla and 14 to 16 in the lower jaw.

Reproduction 

In Central Europe, the mating season of the species is usually between the end of April and June. The males wrestle often violently around the females, although in most populations they are in the majority. The opponents try to push each other to the ground, bite each other and wrap themselves tightly around each other. When mating, the female is bitten in the head or neck region, while the male introduces his two hemipenes into the female's cloaca. Copulation can take several hours. Sometimes females mate with other males later. The gestation period of the females lasts 11 to 14 weeks, and subsequently, between mid-July and the end of August, and sometimes even later, they usually give birth to between eight and twelve young (extreme values: 2 to 28). Slow worms are ovoviviparous; at birth, the 7 to 10 cm long young animals are in a very thin, transparent egg shell, which they pierce immediately afterwards. They initially weigh less than a gram and still have a remnant of the yolk. Juvenile slow worms have a contrasting color scheme and pattern. The top of the body is silvery-white to golden yellow, while the sides and underside are black.

Size and longevity
Adult slow worms grow to be about 50 cm (20") long, and are known for their exceptionally long lives; the slow worm may be the longest-living lizard, living about 30 years in the wild and up to at least 54 years in captivity (this record is held by a male slow worm that lived at the Copenhagen Zoo from 1892 until 1946, the age when first obtained is unknown). The female often has a stripe along the spine and dark sides, while the male may have blue spots dorsally. Juveniles of both sexes are gold with dark brown bellies and sides with a dark stripe along the spine.

Predators 
Predators of A. fragilis include adders, badgers, birds of prey, crows, domestic cats, foxes, hedgehogs, pheasants and smooth snakes.

Ecology 
These reptiles are mostly active during the night and do not bask in the sun like other reptiles, but choose to warm themselves underneath objects such as rocks which have in turn been warmed by the sun. They can often be found in long grass and other damp environments In a 2009 study of a Danish population, the diet of the slow-worm was found to include slugs, snails, earthworms, caterpillars and pill millipedes.

Protected status in the UK
In the United Kingdom, the slow worm has been granted protected status, alongside all other native British reptile species. The slow worm has been decreasing in numbers, and under the Wildlife and Countryside Act 1981, to intentionally kill, injure, sell, or advertise to sell them is illegal.

Ireland
The slow worm is assumed to not be native to Ireland, possibly arriving in the 1900s. Due to their secretive habits they are difficult to observe and have only been sighted in parts of County Clare, mainly in the Burren region.

Evolutionary history 
Members of the genus Anguis, to which the slow worm belongs, first appeared in Europe during the Mammal Paleogene zone 14, between 43.5 and 41.2 million years ago, corresponding to the Lutetian stage of the Eocene. Remains assigned to the Anguis fragilis species complex are known from the late Miocene onwards.

Gallery

See also
 Glass snake

References

External links 
 

Anguis
Articles containing video clips
Lizards of Asia
Lizards of Europe
Reptiles described in 1758
Taxa named by Carl Linnaeus